Ataur Rahman (born 18 June 1941) is a Bangladeshi stage and television actor. He was awarded Ekushey Padak in 2001 and Independence Award in 2021 by the government of Bangladesh for his contribution to drama.

Career
Rahman served as the general secretary and later president of Bangladesh Centre of the International Theatre Institute (BCITI). He is the founder general secretary of the theater troupe "Nagorik Natya Sampradaya". He is a former chairman of Bangladesh Group Theatre Federation.

Rahman directed over 35 plays including "Roktokorobi", "Banglar Mati Banglar Jol", "Narigon", "Irsha", "Opekkhoman", and "Waiting for Godot".

Awards 
 Independence Award (2021)
 Shaheed Munier Chowdhury Award
 “Chakrabak” award as best stage director
 “Loko Natyadal” Gold Medal for stage direction.
 Anyadin & Impress Telefilm award for best character role.
 Alliance Francaise award for contribution in theatre
 Lifetime Achievement Award by Chanel I Rabindra Mela 
 Kazi Mahbubullah Lifetime Award
 Ekushey Padak (2001)

References

Living people
1941 births
People from Noakhali District
University of Dhaka alumni
Bangladeshi male stage actors
Bangladeshi male television actors
Bangladeshi theatre directors
Recipients of the Ekushey Padak
 Honorary Fellows of Bangla Academy
Recipients of the Independence Day Award
20th-century Bengalis
21st-century Bengalis